Roger Hunt  (died c. 1455) was an English MP and Speaker of the House of Commons.

Life
He was of obscure origins, but acquired the manor of Molesworth in Huntingdonshire and acquired a circle of influential friends such as Sir John Tiptoft and John Mowbray, the future Duke of Norfolk. 
About 1402, he leased a London house, perhaps while training as a lawyer at Lincoln's Inn, and became royal attorney for the common pleas, under Tiptoft's patronage, from 1408 to 1410.

In 1407, he was returned as knight of the shire for Huntingdonshire, the first of eighteen times he was elected to parliament, being returned on every occasion except one (December 1421) between then and 1433. 
On three occasions (1414, 1416, and 1420) he chose to represent Bedfordshire, where he had interests at Chawston, instead of Huntingdonshire. 
He was elected Speaker of the House in 1420 and again in 1433.

Following his parliamentary career he was appointed High Sheriff of Cambridgeshire and Huntingdonshire for 1433 and 1434. 
He was appointed second baron of the exchequer in 1439 until 1447.

He died about 1455. 
He had married Margery, whose surname was probably Bullock; they had a son, Roger, who succeeded to his father's estates in July 1456.

References

Attribution

14th-century births
1450s deaths
Speakers of the House of Commons of England
High Sheriffs of Cambridgeshire and Huntingdonshire
Barons of the Exchequer
Members of Lincoln's Inn
Year of birth missing
Year of death uncertain
English MPs 1407
English MPs 1410
English MPs 1411
English MPs February 1413
English MPs May 1413
English MPs April 1414
English MPs November 1414
English MPs 1419
English MPs March 1416
English MPs 1415
English MPs October 1416
English MPs 1417
English MPs 1420
English MPs May 1421
English MPs 1422
English MPs 1423
English MPs 1425
English MPs 1426
English MPs 1427
English MPs 1429
English MPs 1431
English MPs 1432
English MPs 1433